11/3 may refer to:
November 3 (month-day date notation)
March 11 (day-month date notation)
11 shillings and 3 pence in UK predecimal currency
A type of hendecagram
2004 Madrid train bombings
 2011 Tōhoku earthquake and tsunami
 Fukushima Daiichi nuclear disaster, caused by the earthquake and tsunami

See also 
 3/11 (disambiguation)
 113 (disambiguation)